Mentada is a village in Vizianagaram district of the Indian state of Andhra Pradesh, India.

Geography
It has an average elevation of 104 meters (344 ft). This village is located in Champavathi river basin.

Demography
Mentada mandal had a population of 49,071 in 2001. Males constitute 24,355 and females 24,716. The average literacy rate is 38%. Male literacy rate is 49% and that of females 27%.

References 

Villages in Vizianagaram district
Mandal headquarters in Vizianagaram district